Star Bus is a satellite bus family of Orbital ATK. It was originally developed by Thomas van der Heyden, co-founder of CTAI, and later sold to and manufactured by Orbital Sciences Corporation.

The Star Bus satellite platform is designed for various applications, including communications, remote sensing, and scientific missions. The highly configurable platform allows customization to meet specific mission requirements. In addition, it can support a wide range of payloads, including high-resolution imaging systems, microwave sensors, and advanced communication systems.

The Star Bus platform is designed with a modular architecture, allowing for easy integration of various subsystems and payloads. The bus provides power, communications, and data handling capabilities, while the loads provide mission-specific capabilities. The platform is designed to be highly reliable and has been used in various missions, including the Hubble Space Telescope and NASA's New Horizons mission to Pluto.

History
The first satellite program based on the Star Bus platform, developed by Thomas van der Heyden for the Indonesian Direct Broadcast program IndoVision, was IndoStar-1, which was launched in November 1997.

Variants

See also
 GEOStar-2

References

Further reading

 
 

Satellite buses
Orbital Sciences Corporation